Sunflower State FC is a semi-professional soccer team based in Overland Park, Kansas that competes in the National Premier Soccer League as a member of the Heartland Conference and in the Major Arena Soccer League 3 as a member of the Midwest Division. The club was founded in Northwest Arkansas as Ozark FC in 2017, before merging with Sunflower State FC and moving to the Kansas City, Kansas area in 2022. The team colors are yellow, black, and white.

History 

Sunflower State FC was founded as Ozark FC on January 23, 2017, as a National Premier Soccer League expansion team joining the newly formed Heartland Conference.

In the 2017 NPSL season Ozark finished with a 2–8–0 record and last in their conference, missing the playoffs. Home games were played at John Brown University in Siloam Springs, Arkansas.

Ownership interest of Ozark FC transitioned to an ownership group led by Todd Carrigan, Scott Marksberry, and Oddvar Naustvik on March 29, 2018.

In the 2018 NPSL season Ozark finished with a 0–9–1 record, once again finishing last in their conference and missing the playoffs. Home games were played at Veteran's Park in Rogers, Arkansas, Springdale High School in Springdale, Arkansas, and Har-Ber High School in Springdale, Arkansas.

In the 2019 NPSL season Ozark finished with a 3–5–3 record, finishing 4th in their conference and making the playoffs. They lost 2–6 in the first round at Tulsa Athletic. Home games were all played at Har-Ber High School.

Ozark's rivalry with Little Rock Rangers, called the Downriver Derby by Rangers fans, was their main rivalry each season. Out of the six games the clubs played, Ozark won 2 and lost 4.

On January 10, 2022, the NPSL announced the club had come to an agreement with Sunflower State FC to merge clubs, relocate to Kansas City, Kansas, and keep the club name of Sunflower State FC. Games will be played at Blue Valley Northwest High School in Overland Park, Kansas starting in 2022.

Staff

Seasons

2019 schedule

2019 scoring breakdown

2018 schedule 
All times are Central Standard unless otherwise stated

2018 scoring breakdown

2022 NPSL roster

2021 MASL 3 roster

2018 roster

References

External links 
 Facebook
 Instagram
 YouTube

Association football clubs established in 2017
Soccer clubs in Arkansas
National Premier Soccer League teams
2017 establishments in Arkansas